HSwMS Tirfing was the third ship of the  monitors built for the Royal Swedish Navy in the mid-1860s. She was designed under the supervision of the Swedish-born inventor John Ericsson, and built in Sweden. Tirfing made one foreign visit to Russia (visits to Norway did not count as foreign as that country was in a personal union with Sweden) in 1867, but remained in Swedish or Norwegian waters for the rest of her career. The ship was reconstructed between 1903 and 1905, but generally remained in reserve. She was mobilized during World War I and sold in 1922 for conversion to a barge.

Design and description
The John Ericsson-class ironclads were designed to meet the need of the Swedish and Norwegian Navies for small, shallow-draft armored ships capable of defending their coastal waters. John Ericsson, designer and builder of the Monitor, had been born in Sweden, although he had become an American citizen in 1848, and offered to share his design with the Swedes. In response they sent Lieutenant John Christian d'Ailly to the United States to study monitor design and construction under Ericsson. D'Ailly arrived in July 1862 and toured rolling mills, gun foundries, and visited several different ironclads under construction. He returned to Sweden in 1863 having completed the drawings of a Monitor-type ship under Ericsson's supervision.

John Ericsson was divided into nine main compartments by eight watertight bulkheads. Over time a flying bridge and, later, a full superstructure, was added to each ship between the gun turret and the funnel. Initially her crew numbered 80 officers and men, but this increased to 104 as she was modified with additional weapons.

Propulsion
The John Ericsson-class ships had one twin-cylinder vibrating lever steam engines, designed by Ericsson himself, driving a single four-bladed,  propeller. The ships carried  of coal, enough for six day's steaming.

Armament
Tirfing, and her sister ship Thordön, were briefly armed with a pair of  M/66 smoothbore guns before being rearmed in 1873 with two  M/69 rifled breech loaders, derived from a French design. Tirfing received her guns in 1885.

In 1877 each monitor received a pair of 10-barreled  M/75 machine guns designed by Helge Palmcrantz. These guns were replaced during the 1880s by the 4-barreled  M/77 Nordenfeldt gun, which was an enlarged version of Palmcrantz's original design.

Armor
The gun turret's armor consisted of twelve layers of iron, totalling  in thickness on the first four monitors. The inside of the turret was lined with mattresses to catch splinters. The conning tower was positioned on top of the turret and its sides were ten layers thick. The funnel was protected by six layers of armor with a total thickness of  up to half its height.

Service
Tirfing had her keel laid down on 28 January 1865 and was launched 1 June 1866. She was commissioned on 2 July 1867. This was the only foreign visit ever made by the ship.

Tirfing was commissioned less often than her two older sisters. She was only active in 1867, 1873, 1880, 1885 and 1888–89 before she was mobilized for World War I. The ship was reconstructed in 1903–05; she received a pair of new  Bofors M/94 guns that were given elevation limits of −7° and +15°. Tirfing joined her sister Thordön as part of the Göteborg flotilla during World War I. Both ships were decommissioned in 1922 and sold the following year. Their new owner converted them into barges and used them in Stockholm harbor.

Footnotes

References
 
 

John Ericsson-class monitors of the Swedish Navy
1866 ships
Ships built in Norrköping